Evgeni Ivanovich Shevalovski (born 26 March 1949) is a Russian former pair skater who competed for the Soviet Union. With his wife Nadezhda Gorshkova, he is a two-time Prize of Moscow News champion (1974–75) and a three-time Soviet national silver medalist (1974–76). The duo finished in the top six at three ISU Championships.

Results
(with Gorshkova)

References

References
 skatabase

1949 births
Living people
Russian male pair skaters
Soviet male pair skaters
Figure skaters from Moscow